Newell may refer to:

Places

Australia 
 Newell, Queensland, a locality in the Shire of Douglas
 Newell Highway, New South Wales

Canada 
 County of Newell, a municipal district in Alberta

England 
Newell, an old spelling of Newall, West Yorkshire

United States 
Newell, Alabama
Newell, California
Newell, Iowa
Newell, North Carolina
Newell, Ohio
Newell, Pennsylvania
Newell, South Dakota
Newell, West Virginia
Newell Township (disambiguation)

Other uses
 Newell (surname)
 Newell Brands, an American consumer products company
 Newell's Old Boys, an Argentine soccer team
 USS Newell (DE-322), U.S. Navy Edsall-class destroyer escort

See also
 
 Newall (disambiguation)
 Newel (disambiguation)
 Newill (surname)